The PR (performance rating, P-rating) system was a figure of merit developed by AMD, Cyrix, IBM Microelectronics and SGS-Thomson in the mid-1990s (Cyrix announced it in February 1996) as a method of comparing their x86 processors to those of rival Intel. The idea was to consider instructions per cycle (IPC) in addition to the clock speed, so that the processors become comparable with Intel's Pentium that had a higher clock speed with overall lower IPC.

Branding 
The first use of the PR system was in 1995 year, when AMD used it to assert that their AMD 5x86 processor was as fast as a Pentium running at 75 MHz. The designation "P75" was added to the chip to denote this.

The letters PR stood for "Performance Rating", but many people mistakenly thought it stood for "Pentium Rating", as the PR was often used to measure performance against Intel's Pentium processor.

Later that year, Cyrix also adopted the PR system for its 6x86 and 6x86MX line of processors. These processors were capable of handling business applications under Microsoft Windows faster than Pentiums of the same clock speed, so Cyrix PR-rated the chips one or two Pentium speed grades higher than clock speed. AMD did likewise with some versions of their K5 processor, but abandoned the system when it introduced the K6.

Criticism 
The PR system drew criticism, being based on a limited set of benchmark suites which measured only integer performance, a strong point of the K5 and the 6x86 in particular. Experts argued that this made the PR-rated chips poor choices for games, streaming video, or encoding MP3 music.

However, for integer-intensive tasks which were more commonplace at the time, such as word-processing, spreadsheet editing and web browsing, the substantially lower cost of the PR-rated processors allowed the user to afford a higher-spec part. With the demise of the Cyrix MII (a renamed 6x86MX) from the market in 1999, the PR system appeared to be dead, but AMD revived it in 2001 with the introduction of its Athlon XP line of processors.

Pentium 4 competition 
In 2000, Intel debuted its Pentium 4 microprocessor. Although the processor was inferior to its predecessor, the Pentium III, on a clock-for-clock basis, Intel designed the processor to be capable of reaching much higher clock speeds than the Pentium III. Using the fact that the raw Gigahertz (GHz) speed of the Pentium 4 was higher than AMD's Athlon XP microprocessor, Intel advertised the Pentium 4 using clock speed to distinguish between the performance of their different processor models. This marketing was effective for Intel as they had used this method since the introduction of the Pentium, because consumers could compare quantitative clock speeds more easily than comparing qualitative microprocessor features.

In reality, on a clock-for-clock basis, the Athlon XP microprocessor is superior to the Pentium 4 on a number of benchmarks. An Athlon XP with a 2 GHz clock can easily outperform a 2 GHz Pentium 4 on most benchmarks.

Revival for Athlon XP 
In reaction to the consumers' misconception, AMD reinstated the PR to compare their Athlon XP microprocessors. AMD made sure to advertise the PR number of its microprocessors rather than their raw clock speeds believing that customers would compare the PR of AMD's processors to the clock speed of Intel's processors. The PR number was originally believed to show the clock speed (in megahertz) of an equivalent Pentium 4 processor, but this was never confirmed by AMD. As part of its marketing, AMD even made sure that motherboard manufacturers conspicuously showed the PR number of the microprocessor in the motherboards' POST and not include the processors' clock speeds anywhere except within the BIOS.

End of the MHz race 
Between 2001 and 2003, Intel and AMD made few changes to the designs of their processors. Most performance increases were created by raising the processor's clock speed rather than improving the microprocessor's core.  Around mid-2004, Intel encountered serious problems in increasing their Pentium 4's clock speed beyond 3.4 GHz because of the enormous amount of heat generated by the already hot Prescott core processor when working at higher clock speeds.  In response, Intel started exploring ways to improve the performance of its microprocessors in ways other than raising the clock speeds of the processors such as increasing the sizes of the processors' caches, using a P6 microarchitecture descendant in Pentium M CPUs and beyond, and using multiple processing cores in its processors.

Because of the philosophy change, Intel now faces the challenge of making consumers compare its processors based on the PR system rather than raw clock speed, ironically a problem which Intel created itself.

Some analysts regard the PR scheme (and a raw MHz / GHz rating) as nothing more than a marketing tactic, rather than as a useful measure of CPU performance. Many professionals or interested amateurs now consult extensive benchmark tests to determine system performance on various applications.

True Performance Index
True Performance Index (TPI) is used to measure the performance of central processing unit chips produced by manufacturer AMD. For example, the Athlon 3400+ chip has a TPI rating of 3400, hence the name of the model. The True Performance Index is designed to help consumers choose AMD CPU products by comparing them to processors' speeds from competing manufacturers (Intel).

See also
 iCOMP (index)
 Advanced Micro Devices
 Megahertz myth

References

External links 
 Processor Performance Rating (P-rating) Specification, February 1996. Uses Winstone 96.
 P-rating on wikichip

AMD
Rating
Computer performance